The  was a battle in August 1600 that led to the destruction of Gifu Castle in Gifu, Mino Province (modern-day Gifu Prefecture), Japan. The battle served as a prelude to the Battle of Sekigahara the following month. It pitted Oda Hidenobu of the Ishida Mitsunari western forces against Ikeda Terumasa, Ikeda Sen and Fukushima Masanori of the eastern forces and loyal to Tokugawa Ieyasu. The castle was destroyed as a result of the battle.

History of Castle
Gifu castle is located in Gifu Park in Gifu city, on the top of the 300m-high Mount Kinki and was formally known as Inabayama Castle. This castle was earlier built in the 13th century. 
During the year (1494- 1556)  Saito Dosan, who was a ruthless adventurer lived in the Gifu Castle. Then in the 1567 a warlord by the name Oda Nobunaga overtook the castle from the grandson of Saito, Saito Tatsuoki. Oda clan remained in the castle before the battle in 1600

Prelude
As the eastern forces progressed up the Tōkaidō, Oda Hidenobu was not able to predict where the eastern forces would cross the Kiso River and continue their westward march. To defend against all possibilities, Hidenobu set up fortifications throughout the area, with Gifu Castle at the center, dividing his forces and weakening their total strength.

Terumasa's forces
Early in the morning of August 22, the combined eastern forces moved from Haguri District's Kōda (present-day city of Ichinomiya, Aichi Prefecture) in Owari Province to the neighboring Haguri District's Kōdajima (present-day city of Kakamigahara, Gifu Prefecture) in Mino Province. (The two Haguri Districts had previously been one district in Owari Province, hence their same names and proximity.) During their march, they crossed the Kiso River. While crossing the river, a contingent of Hidenobu's musketeers fought their advance in the Battle of Kōda Kisogawa Tokō (河田木曽川渡河の戦い Kōda Kisogawa Tokō no Tatakai) against Ikeda Terumasa forces. 

After defeating the Hidenobu's musketeers, Terumasa's forces continued their march. On the afternoon of August 22, they arrived in the village of Komeno (present-day town of Kasamatsu) and fought a force of 3,000 men under Dodo Tsunaie (百々綱家) at the Battle of Komeno (米野の戦い Komeno no Tatakai) and defeated them. 

At the time of the defeat, Hidenobu was in the nearby village of Injiki (present-day Ginan) and decided to remove his forces to Gifu Castle, instead of attacking the eastern forces where they were.

Masanori's forces
Around the same time, Masanori's forces tried to cross the Kiso River near Owari Province's Nakashima District (present-day Ichinomiya), but they found western forces deeply entrenched on the opposite banks and decided to head further south to cross the river. They eventually crossed at Higashikaganoi and traveled by Kaganoi Castle (加賀野井城 Kaganoi-jō) (in present-day Hashima, Gifu Prefecture) before they turned north and surrounded Takegahana Castle. 

Sugiura Shigekatsu (杉浦重勝) initially resisted Masanori's forces, but Mōri Hiromori (毛利広盛), the leader of his supporting forces, capitulated to Masanori's, and Shigekatsu had no choice but to do the same and Takegahana Castle fell.

After the victories by Terumasa and Masanori, the two forces joined together at the Arata River (荒田川 Arata-gawa) south of Gifu Castle to begin their final advance.

Battle
On the evening of August 22, the combined eastern forces continued their pursuit of Hidenobu. To strengthen his own forces, Hidenobu sent out requests for help to nearby Ōgaki and Inuyama castles. While waiting for the forces to arrive, Hidenobu stayed in Gifu Castle thinking that they would be able to trap the opposing forces between his castle and the supporting forces from Ōgaki and Inuyama. The Toyotomi clan also sent some forces to Gifu Castle to help with the defense.

Even though Hidenobu thought that Gifu Castle could withstand any attack, he still put forces at mountain passes around the castle, protecting each route to it. Hidenobu and his brother Oda Hidenori (織田秀則) were put in charge of the men at Gifu Castle, with Tsuda Tōsaburō (津田藤三郎), Kozukuri Tomoyasu (木造具康), and Dodo Tsunaie in charge of the remaining men, again dividing and weakening Hidenobu's forces.

At daybreak on August 23, the eastern forces received warning of the buildup of forces from Ōgaki and Inuyama castles. To prepare for battle by placing the forces of Yamauchi Kazutoyo, Arima Toyōji (有馬豊氏), Togawa Tatsuyasu (戸川達安), and Horio Tadauji in villages to the southeast of Gifu Castle and the forces of Tanaka Yoshimasa (田中吉政), Tōdō Takatora, and Kuroda Nagamasa to the southwest.

Later in the morning, Hidenobu forces began to move towards Zuiryū-ji, where they encountered Asano Yoshinaga and the fighting began. As Ii Naomasa fought through other mountains on the way to Gifu Castle, Masanori joined him and threw all of his forces into the battle, completely surrounding the castle.

During the battle, no supporting forces from Inuyama Castle arrived. The lord of the castle, Ishikawa Sadakiyo (石川貞清), remained in his castle with other leaders after he made an agreement with Naomasa not to join in the battle. Ōgaki Castle did send supporting forces; however, they were too late to help with the battle.

In September 29, all of Gifu Castle, other than the donjon, fell to the eastern forces. Hidenobu kept fighting until the end, but his army was reduced to just tens of men. Hidenobu was prepared to fight until his death, but was convinced to surrender to the eastern forces. In the end, Gifu Castle fell in just one day.

Aftermath
Hidenobu continued fighting in support of Hideyori; however, after Hideyori's forces lost the Battle of Sekigahara the following month, Hidenobu moved to Mount Kōya and became a monk. He died there five years later.

See also
 List of Japanese battles

References

1600 in Japan
Gifu Castle
Gifu Castle 1600
Gifu